Rheinaue is a Bonn Stadtbahn station served by lines 66 and 68 on the completely new Südbrücke. The station is the only one in the middle of a highway.

Cologne-Bonn Stadtbahn stations